The Azerbaijan national under-21 football team is the national under-21 football team of the Azerbaijan and is controlled by the AFFA.

UEFA U-21 record 
 1978 - 1991: part of USSR
 1992 - 1994: did not participate
 1996: 6th of 6 in qualification group.
 1998: 6th of 6 in qualification group.
 2000: 5th of 5 in qualification group.
 2002: 5th of 6 in qualification group.
 2004: 5th of 5 in qualification group.
 2006: 6th of 6 in qualification group.
 2007: Lost in preliminary round.
 2009: 6th of 6 in qualification group.
 2011: 5th of 5 in qualification group.
 2013: 4th of 5 in qualification group.
 2015: 4th of 5 in qualification group.
 2017: 4th of 6 in qualification group.
 2019: 6th of 6 in qualification group.
 2021: 5th of 6 in qualification group.

2023 UEFA European Under-21 Football Championship

Group A

Schedule and results

2016

2017

2018

2019

2020

Current squad
 The following players were called up for the 2023 UEFA European Under-21 Championship qualification matches.
 Match dates: 3, 7 and 14 June 2022
 Opposition: ,  and 
 Caps and goals correct as of: 29 March 2022, after the match against

Coaching staff

Manager history
 Nazim Aliyev (2006)
 Shakir Garibov (2007–2008)
 Bernhard Lippert (2008–2014)
 Yashar Vahabzade (2015–2017 September)
 Samir Alakbarov (2017 September-2017 November)
 Rashad Sadygov (2017 December-2018 December)
 Milan Obradovic (2019 January–2022 June)
 Samir Aliyev (2022 July–present)

See also 
 Azerbaijan national football team
 Azerbaijan national under-23 football team
 Azerbaijan national under-20 football team
 Azerbaijan national under-19 football team
 Azerbaijan national under-18 football team
 Azerbaijan national under-17 football team

References

European national under-21 association football teams
Under-21
Youth football in Azerbaijan
National, under-21